Community School Corporation of Southern Hancock County is a school district headquartered in New Palestine, Indiana.

Schools
Secondary:
 New Palestine High School
 New Palestine Junior High School

Primary:
 New Palestine Intermediate School
 Brandywine Elementary School
 New Palestine Elementary School
 Sugar Creek Elementary School

Preschool:
 Little Dragons Preschool

References

External links
 Community School Corporation of Southern Hancock County
 District map
Education in Hancock County, Indiana
school districts in Indiana